No Answer may refer to:

 The Electric Light Orchestra (album), the 1971 debut album by the eponymous English rock band, released in the US as No Answer 
 No Answer: Lower Floors, a 2013 studio album by American noise music group Wolf Eyes

See also 
 Answer (disambiguation)
 No for an Answer, a musical play by Marc Blitzstein which premiered in 1941
 No case to answer, a term in British criminal law